Hellinsia solanoi is a moth of the family Pterophoridae. It is found in Costa Rica.

Adults are on wing in October.

References

Moths described in 1999
solanoi
Moths of Central America